Game chicken or Game Chicken may refer to:

 The Gamecock or game fowl, chickens bred for cockfighting
 A Game Chicken, a lost silent film from 1922
 Hen Pearce (1777–1809), English bare-knuckle prizefighter